Bangana diplostoma is a species of cyprinid fish found in India and Pakistan.

References

Bangana
Fish described in 1838
Taxa named by Johann Jakob Heckel